Francis Napier may refer to:
 Francis Napier, 10th Lord Napier (1819–1898), Scottish polyglot, diplomat and colonial administrator
 Francis Napier, 15th Lord Napier (born 1962), Scottish nobleman
 Francis Napier, 6th Lord Napier (1702–1773), Scottish peer
 Francis Napier, 8th Lord Napier (1758–1823), British peer and army officer
 Francis Napier, 12th Lord Napier (1876–1941), British peer